James Alexander "Casey" Jones (December 15, 1920 – April 7, 1989) was an American football back who played one season with the Detroit Lions of the National Football League. He was drafted by the Detroit Lions in the sixth round of the 1943 NFL Draft. He played college football at Union University and attended Coffee High School in Florence, Alabama.

References

External links
Just Sports Stats

1920 births
1989 deaths
Players of American football from Alabama
American football running backs
Union Bulldogs football players
Detroit Lions players
Sportspeople from Florence, Alabama